Credit Suisse Securities Japan Limited “Mass Understatement of Income Tax” Case has been a lingering court case pertaining to employees and former employees of Credit Suisse Securities.

Incident
It started in November 2008, 300 of employees and former employees of Credit Suisse Securities were summoned from the competent tax office simultaneously.  They were all front-office employees whose salary was renewed every year, and received shares of CSG including company restricted stock (called “phantom shares” which they cannot liquidate for certain period) and employee stock options as compensation in the accounts that each of them opened at the affiliated company of CSG in US.  This compensation plan was extremely complicated to understand, and the income taxes due in Japan had not been withheld.

Most of 300 employees and former employees understated tax reporting of the stock-based compensation and roughly 100 of them completely failed to declare their income of stock-based compensation.

At the same time employees of not only CS Securities but also other foreign investment banks such as JP Morgan Chase were investigated and hundreds of cases were exposed as understating income tax.

Among hundreds of cases only one person, Mr. Takashi “Terry” Hatta from CS Securities, was accused by Taxation Bureau and prosecuted by the Public Prosecutors.

Tokyo Regional Taxation Bureau initiated the investigation into Mr. Hatta in December 2008, but it took a whole year until they finally made an accusation in 2009; this accusation was taken up by the Tokyo District Public Prosecutors, however it was after a year and nine months that the Special Investigation Team started voluntary questioning the defendant; the questioning took three months.  The total lengths of these processes took three years which was exceptionally a long stretch for an investigation of evading taxes.  Mr. Hatta has kept denial claiming that he didn't file taxes because he believed that income tax from the stock-based compensation had already been withheld by the firm which is usually the case for all cash compensation: he never intended to evade his taxes.  The Special Investigation Team indicted him without arrest which was exceptional as well.  There were a full of irregular handlings in this case from the outset.

Trials
1st trial of Tokyo District Court was held on Feb 22, 2012. At district court level, 11 times of trials were held until Mar 1, 2013.

On Mar 1, 2013, Tokyo District Court sentenced not guilty of these, fully admitting the defendant's claim that he has never intended to evade tax.  The instance of not guilty for Taxation Bureau and the Public Prosecutors was very first case in Japanese history.

The Public Prosecutors appealed to Tokyo High Court immediately.

1st trial of Tokyo High Court was held on Nov 15, 2013.  The trial was concluded with only one trial which was exceptional for the case of the Public Prosecutors appealing.

On Jan 31, 2014, Tokyo High Court dismissed the Public Prosecutors appealing.

On Feb 14, 2014, the Public Prosecutors gave up appealing and innocence of Mr. Hatta was determined.

Mr. Hatta has sued the country claiming 500MM yen. 1st trial of the State Redress was held on Jul 28, 2014.

Articles
Japanese Wikipedia has detailed information of Credit Suisse Securities Japan Limited “Mass Understatement of Income Tax” Case.

Several of eminent journalists wrote articles defending Mr. Hatta in magazines and internet media, such as Ms. Shoko Egawa, Mr. Chikaki Tanaka  and Mr. Osamu Aoki.

Books
Mr. Chikaki Tanaka “Tax Reporter – Real Life of the Inspection Team of Taxation Bureau (Japanese)” (introducing Credit Suisse Securities Japan Limited “Mass Understatement of Income Tax” Case)

Mr. Takashi “Terry” Hatta “Challenge for Zero Probability – How Was the Historic Decision of Not-Guilty Brought (Japanese)” (published on May 16, 2014)

References 

Controversies in Japan
2008 controversies